MTJ may refer to:

Maulana Tariq Jamil
Magnetic tunnel junction
Montrose Regional Airport (airport code MTJ)
Mesivtha Tifereth Jerusalem, a yeshiva
Fukio Mitsuji, video game designer (nickname) 
Married to Jonas, a reality show starring Kevin Jonas and his wife Danielle Deleasa
Mendocino Triple Junction, a plate tectonic feature
Martin Truex Jr., American professional stock car racing driver